Paralipsa is a genus of snout moths described by Arthur Gardiner Butler in 1879.

Species
 Paralipsa decolorella Ragonot, 1901
 Paralipsa exacta Whalley, 1962
 Paralipsa erubella Hampson, 1901
 Paralipsa gularis (Zeller, 1877)

References

Tirathabini
Pyralidae genera